Tumay is a given name and surname. Notable people with the name include:
 
Alex Tumay (born 1986), American audio engineer and DJ
Tümay Ertek (1938–2011), Turkish economist

See also
Tumay Huaraca District in Peru